Alan Cristobal Sanchez (July 1, 1988 – December 1, 2020) was an American soccer player.

Career

College and Amateur
Sanchez attended Felix Varela High School, where he was named his team's MVP and to the All-Dade County first team in his senior year. He played club soccer for West Kendall in the USL Super-Y League, and with them won the State Cup and Disney Showcase in 2005.

Sanchez played four years of college soccer at North Carolina State University. He was named to the All-ACC second-team, the ACC All-Freshmen Team as a freshman in 2006, All-ACC second-team as a junior in 2008, All-ACC first-team and All-ACC Tournament Team as a senior in 2009.

During his college years Sanchez also played in the USL Premier Development League for Carolina Dynamo and the Cary Clarets.

Professional
Sanchez turned professional in 2010 when he signed to play for the Real Maryland Monarchs in the USL Second Division. He made his professional debut on April 17, 2010, in the team's 2010 season opener against the Pittsburgh Riverhounds, and scored his first professional goal on May 13, 2010, the winner in a 3–2 victory over the Harrisburg City Islanders.

Sanchez joined Charlotte Eagles of the USL Pro league for the 2011 season.

In 2011, Sanchez was unsuccessful at landing a contract at trials with clubs San Marcos De Arica and Universidad Catolica in Chile's Primera Division.

Death
Sanchez died on December 1, 2020.

References

External links
Real Maryland Monarchs bio
NC State bio

1988 births
2020 deaths
American soccer players
NC State Wolfpack men's soccer players
North Carolina Fusion U23 players
Cary Clarets players
Charlotte Eagles players
Real Maryland F.C. players
Crystal Palace Baltimore players
USL League Two players
USL Second Division players
USSF Division 2 Professional League players
USL Championship players
Association football midfielders
Soccer players from Miami